Association Sportive et Culturelle de la Snim known as ASC SNIM is a professional Mauritanean football club playing in the city of Nouadhibou  the capital of Dakhlet Nouadhibou Region.  Its main sponsor and owner of club is SNIM (Société Nationale Industrielle et Minière), Iron ore company.

History
The club was founded in 1976 and is Nouadhibou's oldest club.

The team was named CF Cansado (Club de Football de Cansado) when it was owned by Cansado from 2009 to 2012.

The club as Cansado went to the 2010 Mauritanian Super Cup and lost the match 3-1 and the title to Tevragh-Zeina.

Logo
Its logo colours are blue and orange and has a shield-crest with the full name of the club on top, the SNIM logo in the middle with club names around it and has four blue circular stripes and a blue tab with the club's location written in the middle and coloured in gold.

Uniforms

Its uniform colours are a blue shirt, blue socks and light orange shorts during home games, and white t-shirt with thin blue wavy stripes on top and on socks, and light blue shorts during away or alternate games.

Its uniform up to 2009 was a blue-light orange t-shirt with blue sleeves and blue socks and a light orange shorts for home games.

Achievements
Mauritanean Premier League
Champion (2): 2009, 2010.
Runner-up (1): 2007.

Coupe du Président de la République
Winner (1): 1992.
Finalist (0): .

Coupe de la Ligue Nationale
Winner (0): .
Finalist (1): 2012.

Mauritanian Super Cup
Winner (0): .
Finalist (1): 2010.

League and cup history

Performance in CAF competitions

Positions
2011/12: 4th
2013/14: 2nd (Group A), 6th (Final Stage)

Statistics
Best position: Preliminaries (continental)
Best position at cup competitions: Second Round (continental)
Appearances at a Super Cup competition: Once (national)
Total goals scored at the Super Cup: 1 (national)
Total matches played at the CAF Champions League: 2
Total matches played at cup competitions: 2
Total number of wins at the continental level: 2
Total number of goals scored at the continental level: 5
CAF Champions League: 2
Cup competitions: 3

Coaches
 Mbodj Amadou (until 2012/13)
 Sidi Ould Sidha (as of 2014)

Notes

External links
main sponsor SNIM
Team profile - maurifoot.net

Football clubs in Mauritania
1976 establishments in Mauritania
Football